Abel Sánchez Vargas (born 31 October 1971) is a Peruvian diver. He competed in two events at the 2000 Summer Olympics.

References

External links
 

1971 births
Living people
Peruvian male divers
Olympic divers of Peru
Divers at the 2000 Summer Olympics
Sportspeople from Lansing, Michigan